Danil Aleksandrovich Glebov (born 3 November 1999) is a Russian football player. He plays as a central midfielder for FC Rostov and the Russia national team.

Club career
He made his debut in the Russian Professional Football League for FC Anzhi-2 Makhachkala on 19 November 2017 in a game against FC Armavir.

He made his debut in the Russian Premier League for FC Anzhi Makhachkala on 1 September 2018 in a game against FC Krylia Sovetov Samara.

On 13 January 2019, he signed with FC Rostov.

International career
He was called up to the Russia national football team for the first time for World Cup qualifiers against Slovakia and Slovenia in October 2021. He made his debut on 11 November 2021 in a game against Cyprus.

Honours
Individual
 Russian Premier League Player of the Month: November 2022.
 Russian Premier League Goal of the Month: November 2022.

Career statistics

Club

International

References

External links
 

1999 births
Sportspeople from Tomsk
Living people
Russian footballers
Russia under-21 international footballers
Russia international footballers
Association football midfielders
FC Anzhi Makhachkala players
FC Rostov players
Russian Premier League players
Russian Second League players